William Harrington (born 15 January 1942) is  a former Australian rules footballer who played with Footscray in the Victorian Football League (VFL).

Harrington played with Albury in 1964.

Notes

External links 
		

Living people
1942 births
Australian rules footballers from Victoria (Australia)
Western Bulldogs players
West Footscray Football Club players